Anna Heather Frost (born 1 November 1981) is a New Zealand trail and ultra runner.

Running career 
Frost turned professional in 2004 and later began running for Team Salomon.

In 2012, she won the Transvulcania ultramarathon in the Canary Islands in a record time of 8:11:31., but did not return to defend her title the next year. She finished first at the Speedgoat 50K in Utah in 2012, second at the Ultra Cavalls del Vent in the Pyrenees mountains of Spain, and first at the Maxi-Race in Annecy, France. In June 2013, she won the Trail du Colorado race in Réunion.

In 2010, Frost won the overall title in the Skyrunner World Series. The series included wins at the Table Mountain Challenge and the Three Peaks Race, among others.

In 2014, Frost won the Bear 100 Mile Endurance Run in Utah in her first attempt at the 100 mile distance. Having used the race as a qualifier for the Hardrock 100 in Colorado, she won Hardrock the following year.

Frost is sponsored by Merrell and Icebreaker, among others.

Personal life
Frost is from Dunedin, New Zealand. She and her husband, Ron Braselton, had their first child in March 2019.

In 2015, the SisuGirls project began releasing a series of middle-grade books covering true stories of women in action and adventure sports. The first book in the series, Fearless Frosty, was written by Chloe Chick and focuses on Anna Frost.

Results

References

External links 
 

New Zealand female long-distance runners
Living people
1981 births
Female ultramarathon runners
New Zealand ultramarathon runners
New Zealand sky runners